Dominique Gros (born 2 January 1943) is a French politician. He was the mayor of Metz between 2008 and 2020.

External links
  Le Point.fr info

1943 births
Living people
Socialist Party (France) politicians
Politicians from Metz
People from Riom
Mayors of places in Grand Est